Maculifer is a genus of trematodes in the family Opecoelidae.

Species
Maculifer dayawanensis Shen & Tong, 1990
Maculifer indicus (Gupta, 1968) Cribb, 2005
Maculifer japonicus Layman, 1930
Maculifer lagocephali (Liu, 1999) Cribb, 2005
Maculifer pacificus Yamaguti, 1938
Maculifer subaequiporus Nicoll, 1915
Maculifer zhoushanensis Shen, 1986

References

Opecoelidae
Plagiorchiida genera